Benjamin or Ben Allen may refer to:

 Benjamin Allen (British politician) (c. 1742–1791), British Member of Parliament for Bridgewater
 Benjamin Allen (clergyman) (1789–1829), American Episcopal clergyman
 Benjamin Allen (Wisconsin politician) (1807–1873), American lawyer, Civil War officer, and Wisconsin politician
 Benjamin F. Allen (1817–?), American lawyer and politician in the Florida House of Representatives
 Benjamin Allen (Canadian politician) (1830–1912), Canadian politician and retail merchant
 Benjamin Dwight Allen (1831–1914), American composer and organist
 Benjamin Allen (cartoonist) (1903–1971), American cartoonist
 Benjamin J. Allen (born 1947), American economist and university administrator
 Ben Allen (California politician) (born 1978), American lawyer and politician
 Ben H. Allen, American record producer, mixer, and songwriter

See also 
 Ben Allan (born 1968), Australian rules footballer
 Percy Allen (politician) (Percy Benjamin Allen, 1913–1992), New Zealand politician
 Allen (surname)